Jin Hee-kyung (born September 7, 1968) is a South Korean actress.

Filmography

Film

Television series

Awards

References

External links
 
 
 

South Korean film actresses
South Korean television actresses
1968 births
Living people
People from North Jeolla Province